Perth Stadium bus station is a Transperth bus station, located at the southern edge of Perth Stadium in Burswood, Western Australia. It has 22 stands and is served by eight Transperth special event routes.

Bus routes

, ten bus routes service Perth Stadium Bus Station. These routes connect suburbs without train lines, and only operate before and after events at Perth stadium.

With the opening of the Matagarup Bridge on 14 July 2018, route 661 was adjusted to service the bus stands near Matagarup Bridge on Nelson Avenue, East Perth. The opening of the bridge also caused the other suburban bus routes to change their bus stands at the bus station.

As of 13 March 2019, the route 655 had introduced to adding in the bus services to Kalamunda via Belmont and Forrestfield. While the route 661 no longer runs in circular and start and terminates at Brookfield Place in Perth CBD, and moved back the terminus from Matagarup Bridge bus stands to Perth Stadium Bus Station to make the room at Nelson Avenue for Taxis and on-demand public transport. Those changes are effective from 24 March 2019.

 Stop number are shown as the first stand of the stand group.

Notes

References

External links
 

Bus stations in Perth, Western Australia
Burswood, Western Australia